The 2009 German Grand Prix (officially the Formula 1 Grosser Preis Santander von Deutschland 2009)  was the ninth race of the 2009 Formula One season. It was held on 12 July 2009 at the Nürburgring in Nürburg, Germany; the earliest German Grand Prix on the calendar (a feat since beat by the 2013 race), since 1926.

Australian Mark Webber took both his first pole position and his first Grand Prix win, with Sebastian Vettel coming in second, giving Red Bull their third 1-2 of 2009. Championship leader Jenson Button could only manage fifth.

Report

Background 
Barrichello was 2 points further in front of Red Bull Racing's Sebastian Vettel, winner of the British Grand Prix. Brawn GP had a sizeable lead of 30.5 points in the Constructors' Championship with Red Bull Racing in second place. Toyota were 30 points behind the Austrian Red Bull team, with only Force India yet to score a point. The three former World Champions in the F1 field, Fernando Alonso, Kimi Räikkönen and Lewis Hamilton were 9th, 10th and 11th in the Championship, with 11, 10 and 9 points respectively.

2008 champion Lewis Hamilton won the 2008 German Grand Prix for McLaren-Mercedes, at Hockenheim. Former German Grand Prix winners in the field for 2009 include Fernando Alonso of Renault and Rubens Barrichello of Brawn GP. Barrichello and Alonso have also been successful at the Nürburgring when the circuit hosted the European Grand Prix.

The Nürburgring has the unique honour of hosting four different Formula One Grands Prix (see List of races at the Nürburgring): the German Grand Prix on the old track in the 1950s, 60s and 70s as well as on the GP track in 1985 and on the revised circuit in 2009; the European Grand Prix in 1984 and from 1995 to 2007, with the exception of 1997 and 1998, when it was the Luxembourg Grand Prix. Most recently, F1 raced at the Nürburgring in 2020 for the Eifel Grand Prix, as part of a revised calendar due to Covid-19.

Practice and Qualifying

Qualifying saw drivers switch strategies to using wet weather tyres due to the rain and wet track. The track was dry as the drivers headed out for the first session. This yielded no surprises as the two Toro Rossos of Sébastien Buemi and Sébastien Bourdais were eliminated along with Giancarlo Fisichella's Force India, and the consistently underperforming Toyota of Timo Glock and BMW Sauber of Robert Kubica. Glock was later given a three place grid drop for blocking Renault's Fernando Alonso, but since he qualified 19th anyway this sent him to the back of the grid.

In the second session, the rain began to fall. This gave us some more interesting results, with both Williams cars going out. Both Nico Rosberg and Kazuki Nakajima said that they would have done better had it not been for the rain. They were joined in elimination by Alonso, Jarno Trulli's Toyota and Nick Heidfeld, who did well to qualify 11th in the other BMW Sauber. The German claimed he could have done even better, but the rain upset his strategy as well.

Nelson Piquet Jr. in the other Renault made the final session for the first time in 2009, but only managed 10th as the rain eased off again in the last ten minutes. The Ferraris of Felipe Massa and Kimi Räikkönen were disappointing, only managing 8th and 9th respectively. Räikkönen's race engineer Chris Dyer said that they didn't have any soft tyres left for the last qualifying lap, which cost them very dear. Adrian Sutil did excellently in the Force India to qualify not only in the top 10 for the first time, but ahead of the Ferraris in 7th. The McLarens of Lewis Hamilton and Heikki Kovalainen came 5th and 6th respectively, and both thanked the upgrades to the car for their improved performances.

Then came the fight for pole, which was solely between the four championship contenders - the Brawns of Jenson Button and Rubens Barrichello and the Red Bulls of Sebastian Vettel and Mark Webber. Webber was the first to cross the line in 1:32.230. Then Vettel did well to do 1:32.480, but it was a surprise for him to be beaten by his teammate. This looked to be the order, but Barrichello and Button both crossed the line in the dying seconds to split the Red Bulls, so Webber claimed the first pole position of his career. He described it as a "special day".

Race
Mark Webber and Rubens Barrichello were side by side coming to the first corner where Webber clashed wheels with the Brazilian, for which he later received a drive-through penalty. The Brawn driver still managed to jump the Red Bull driver to take the lead. Lewis Hamilton also made a fast start in the McLaren and challenged for the lead, but he made slight contact with Webber at the first corner and received a puncture, ending his chance for points. He lost a lap in the pits, ultimately finishing 18th, still one lap down. Jarno Trulli also collided with Kazuki Nakajima's Williams at the first corner, and the Italian had to pit for a new nosecone for his Toyota, leaving him at the back of the field with Hamilton.

Webber retook the lead on lap 15 as Barrichello pitted and soon after pitted but returned in the lead, which was a good job as he pitted again for the drive through penalty soon after that, which dropped him to eighth. This left Felipe Massa in the lead in the Ferrari followed by Barrichello and Kimi Räikkönen.

Bourdais retired due to hydraulic problems on his lap 19, in what would ultimately be his final race at Scuderia Toro Rosso. Adrian Sutil in the Force India climbed into second before his first pitstop, but as he emerged from the pits he collided with Räikkönen's Ferrari. The German had to pit again for a new nosecone, and lost several places.

Barrichello retook the lead after Massa's pitstop, but lost it again to an impressively recovering Webber in the second stops. Teammate Sebastian Vettel also briefly led before everything settled down with Webber in the lead.

Räikkönen retired with a radiator problem on lap 35, briefly promoting Giancarlo Fisichella into the points, but the Italian failed to score his first points for Force India, as his pitstop allowed former teammate Fernando Alonso into the points in his Renault.

Alonso made a late charge as Jenson Button and Rubens Barrichello struggled for grip, but he could not find a way past. Despite the drive through penalty for impeding Barrichello on the first lap, Webber came home to claim his maiden victory and become this first Australian winner in almost thirty years. He was followed home by Vettel, who was over nine seconds behind. Massa came home a distant but impressive third, his first and only podium of the year as he was injured during qualifying for the next race and didn't race again for the rest of the season. Jenson Button had managed to jump teammate Barrichello during the second stops and came home fifth with the Brazilian very close behind, and also closely followed by Alonso. The Spaniard had made a charge in the closing stages but was unable to find a way past the Brawns, despite setting the race's faster lap, who were struggling for grip. Heikki Kovalainen occupied the final points paying position in an ultimately disappointing race for McLaren.

Webber said it was an "incredible day" for him, and his sentiments were echoed by Red Bull sporting director Christian Horner, who described his team's 1-2 finish as a "brilliant team performance". Webber's win was the first for an Australian driver since  World Champion Alan Jones won the 1981 Caesars Palace Grand Prix.

Classification
Cars that used KERS are marked with "‡"

Qualifying

Timo Glock received a 3 place grid-penalty for obstructing Fernando Alonso. As he was already 19th on the grid, he was sent to the rear.

Race

Championship standings after the race 

Drivers' Championship standings

Constructors' Championship standings

 Note: Only the top five positions are included for both sets of standings.

See also 
 2009 Nürburgring GP2 Series round

References

External links

German
German Grand Prix
Grand Prix
Sport in Rhineland-Palatinate
German Grand Prix